Saint Severianus (died 21 February 453) was bishop of Scythopolis in Palestine.
He was martyred and is considered a saint.
His feast day is 21 February.

Life

Scythopolis was made the capital of the new province of Palaestine secunda around 400 by the emperor Theodosius II.
The relationship between the bishop of Scythopolis and the metropolitan of Caesarea was not well defined.
Severianus was appointed bishop of Scythopolis, metropolitan of the province of Palestine II.
His name is among the signatories to the Definition of Faith of the Council of Chalcedon (451), but he probably was not present at the council.

Severianus was killed because he had implemented the Chalcedonian faith among the Christians of Palestine.
He was murdered during the unrest caused by the Definition of the Faith, which stated that the divinity and humanity of Christ were two distinct but inseparable natures, contradicting the archimandrite Eutyches.

Butler's account

The hagiographer Alban Butler wrote in the Lives of the fathers, martyrs, and other principal saints (1821),

Notes

Sources

5th-century Byzantine bishops
453 deaths
5th-century Christian martyrs
Palestinian bishops
Bishops of the Greek Orthodox Church of Jerusalem
Ancient Roman murder victims
Ancient Christians involved in controversies